Arthur Mesac Knight (9 July 18644 October 1939) was the third Bishop of Rangoon from 1903 to 1909.

He was educated at Rossall and Pembroke College, Cambridge. Ordained in 1890, he was initially a Curate at St Andrew’s, Bishop Auckland before becoming Fellow and Dean of Gonville and Caius College, Cambridge and a Lecturer in Divinity at the university.

He was appointed to the episcopate in December 1902, based on the recommendation of the Secretary of State for India. Taking up the position early in 1903, he only served for six years, afterwards becoming Warden of  St Augustine’s Missionary College, Canterbury. From 1928, his last posts were as Rector of Lyminge (until 1935) and Assistant Bishop of Canterbury (until his death).

References 

1864 births
1939 deaths
People educated at Rossall School
Alumni of Pembroke College, Cambridge
Fellows of Gonville and Caius College, Cambridge
20th-century Anglican bishops in Asia
Anglican bishops of Rangoon